AES uses a key schedule to expand a short key into a number of separate round keys.  The three AES variants have a different number of rounds. Each variant requires a separate 128-bit round key for each round plus one more. The key schedule produces the needed round keys from the initial key.

Round constants 

The round constant  for round  of the key expansion is the 32-bit word:

where  is an eight-bit value defined as :

Equivalently:

The key schedule 

Define:
  as the length of the key in 32-bit words: 4 words for AES-128, 6 words for AES-192, and 8 words for AES-256
  as the number of round keys needed: 11 round keys for AES-128, 13 keys for AES-192, and 15 keys for AES-256

Also define  as a one-byte left circular shift:

Then for :

Notes

References 

 FIPS PUB 197: the official AES standard (PDF file)

External links 
 Description of Rijndael's key schedule
 schematic view of the key schedule for 128 and 256 bit keys for 160-bit keys on Cryptography Stack Exchange

Advanced Encryption Standard
Key management